Amaurochrous is a genus of turtle bugs in the family Pentatomidae. There are about six described species in Amaurochrous.

Species
These six species belong to the genus Amaurochrous:
 Amaurochrous brevitylus Barber & Sailer, 1953
 Amaurochrous cinctipes (Say, 1828)
 Amaurochrous dubius (Palisot, 1805)
 Amaurochrous magnus Barber & Sailer, 1953
 Amaurochrous ovalis Barber & Sailer, 1953
 Amaurochrous vanduzeei Barber & Sailer, 1953

References

Further reading

 
 

Podopinae
Pentatomidae genera
Articles created by Qbugbot